Greger Artursson (born 6 February 1972 in Västerås, Sweden) is a Swedish former professional ice hockey Defenseman who played predominantly in the Elitserien with Färjestads BK.

Artursson began his professional career in 1988 with Färjestads, which he played with from 1988–1992 and 1995–2004. Between 1992 and 1995 did he represented Vita Hästen and Troja-Ljungby in the second highest league in Sweden. During his second stint with Färjestad did he won the Swedish Championship three times, 1997, 1998 and 2002.  In the 1998 final-series Färjestad play against arch-rival Djurgårdens IF and the fifth and last game of series went to overtime and Artursson became big hero when he scored in overtime shooting the puck past Djurgården-goalie Tommy Söderström and ended the game.

After four years with EC Red Bull Salzburg in the Austrian Hockey League, Greger returned to Sweden in 2008 to play with Mora IK in the HockeyAllsvenskan. After captaining his second year with Mora, Artursson retired from professional hockey on 13 March 2010 after his final game against Almtuna IS to take up a post as a vendor in a sports company.

Career statistics

References

External links 

1972 births
Living people
Swedish ice hockey defencemen
Swedish expatriate sportspeople in Austria
EC Red Bull Salzburg players
Färjestad BK players
Mora IK players